Mount Huntington may refer to one of three peaks in the United States:

Mount Huntington (Alaska)
Mount Huntington (California)
Mount Huntington (New Hampshire), see List of mountains of New Hampshire